The Bima language, or Bimanese (Bima: ,) is an Austronesian language spoken on the eastern half of Sumbawa Island, Indonesia, which it shares with speakers of the Sumbawa language. Bima territory includes the Sanggar Peninsula, where the extinct Papuan language Tambora was once spoken. Bima is an exonym; the autochthonous name for the territory is Mbojo and the language is referred to as Nggahi Mbojo. There are over half a million Bima speakers. Neither the Bima nor the Sumbawa people have alphabets of their own for they use the alphabets of the Bugis and the Malay language indifferently.

Classification
Long thought to be closely related to the languages of Sumba Island to the southeast, this assumption has been refuted by Blust (2008), which makes Bima a primary branch within the Central–Eastern Malayo-Polynesian subgroup.

Distribution
Bima is primarily spoken on the eastern half of Sumbawa Island in Indonesia. It also spoken in the Banta, Sangeang, and Komodo islands.

Dialects
According to Ethnologue, dialects of the language include Kolo, Sangar (Sanggar), Toloweri, Bima, and Mbojo.

Donggo, spoken in mountainous regions to the west of Bima Bay, such as in Doro Ntika of the Doro Oromboha area, is closely related to the main dialect of Bima. It is spoken by about 25,000 people who were formerly primarily Christians and animists; many have converted to Islam, mostly as a result of intermarriages.

Phonology

Consonants

Vowels 

References

Further reading

External links 
 Paradisec has a collection of open access recordings of Bima from a 2005 language documentation class, as well as some recordings from Robert Blust.
 Kaipuleohone also has an open-access collection of Robert Blust's materials including a recording of Bima.
 https://www.unicode.org/L2/L2022/22150-biima-script.pdf

Languages of Indonesia
Central Malayo-Polynesian languages
Sumbawa